The Khorezm People's Soviet Republic was the state created as the successor to the Khanate of Khiva in February 1920, when the Khan abdicated in response to pressure. It was officially declared by the First Khorezm Kurultay (Assembly) on 26 April 1920. On 20 October 1923, it was transformed into the Khorezm Socialist Soviet Republic.

On 27 October 1924 the Khorezm SSR was divided between Uzbek and Turkmen SSRs and the Karakalpak Autonomous Oblast as part of the delimitation of Central Asia according to nationalities.

Politics

Chairman of the Revolutionary Committee
 Mulla Dzhumaniyaz Sultanmuradov (2 February 1920 – 26 April 1920)

Chairmen of the Presidium of the Assembly (Kurultoy) of People's Representatives
Palvanniyaz Khodzhi Yusupov (26 April 1920 – 6 March 1921)
Dzhabbarbergen Kuchkarov (6 March 1921 – 15 May 1921; continues as supreme authority to 23 May 1921)
Khudaybergen Divanov (15 May 1921 – 23 May 1921)

Chairmen of the Presidium of the Central Executive Committee

Madrakhim Allabergenov (23 May 1921 – 5 September 1921)
Mulla Ata-Maksum Madrakhimov (5 September 1921 – 27 November 1921)
Yangibay Muradov (27 November 1921 – 23 July 1922)
Abdulla Khodzhayev "Khadzhi Baba" (23 July 1922 – 20 October 1922)
Atadzhan Safayev (20 October 1922 – 26 March 1923)
Abdulla Khodzhayev "Khadzhi Baba" (March 1923 – 20 October 1923)
Karim Safayev (20 October 1923 – 26 March 1924)
Mukhamed Abdusalyamov (17 January 1924 – 19 February 1924) (acting)
Sultan-Kary Dzhumaniyazov (26 March 1924 – 17 September 1924)
Nedirbay Aytakov (17 September 1924 – 27 October 1924)
Sultan-Kary Dzhumaniyazov (October 1924 – 23 November 1924)

Geography 
The Khorezm People's National Republic bordered on the Turkestan Autonomous Soviet Socialist Republic to the north and to the south, and on the Bukharan People's Soviet Republic to the east. Its western border was a rough continuation of the western coast of Aral Sea, bordering on what was then the Kirghiz ASSR (today's western Kazakhstan). Its capital was Khiva.

See also 
Khwarazm
Khanate of Khiva
Bukharan People's Soviet Republic

References

External links 

History of the Khorezm People's Soviet Republic: The first Khorezm Kurultay
History of the Khorezm People's Soviet Republic: Djunaid Khan's revolt

1920 establishments in Russia
1925 disestablishments in the Soviet Union
Geographic history of Uzbekistan
20th century in Turkmenistan
Early Soviet republics
Former socialist republics
Russian-speaking countries and territories
States and territories established in 1920
States and territories disestablished in 1925
Soviet Central Asia
Former countries of the interwar period
Post–Russian Empire states